Amblyseius parakaguya is a species of mite in the family Phytoseiidae. It is found in Europe.

References

parakaguya
Articles created by Qbugbot
Animals described in 2002